The No. 14 Squadron, nicknamed Tail Choppers, is an air superiority squadron of the Pakistan Air Force's Central Air Command. It is one of PAF's most decorated squadrons which earned its nickname after a daring strike mission on the Kalaikunda Air Force Station during the 1965 War. Currently, the Squadron is deployed at PAF Base Rafiqui and operates the PAC JF-17 Thunder multirole aircraft.

History

The No. 14 Squadron was the PAF's first fighter-bomber squadron, which was raised on 1 November 1948, at RPAF Base Peshawar and operated the Hawker Tempest fighters which were inherited from the RIAF but were later re-equipped with newly acquired Hawker Fury fighter-bombers after being number-plated for some months.
In 1956, the squadron was transferred to PAF Base Mauripur and re-equipped with F-86 Sabres. They participated extensively in various inter-squadron competitions and exercises.

North Waziristan operations 

After the independence of Pakistan, several armed militant groups in the North-West Frontier Province which were previously engaged in an armed conflict with the British Raj turned against Pakistan. This time backed by the Kingdom of Afghanistan, the armed groups started a rebellion against the Dominion of Pakistan. Resultantly, the No. 14 squadron was deployed at Miranshah airfield at North Waziristan for counter insurgency operations during which it bombed several rebel targets. In 1953–54, the Squadron also launched a bombing operation on Faqir of Ipi's strongholds at Gurwek.

1965 Indo-Pakistani war 

During the 1965 war, the No. 14 Squadron was deployed at Tejgaon Air Base and initially operated 12 North American F-86F Sabres but one was lost to a bird strike on 4 September so it operated 11 units throughout the war. The Squadron didn't participate in any offensive operations during the rise in hostilities over the disputed Indian Administered Kashmir region but it had been on high alert since the Rann of Kutch conflict before the invasion. In retaliation for the Indian invasion, the PAF launched an aggressive airstrike campaign on several IAF bases.

Airstrikes on Kalaikunda Airbase 
The No. 14 Squadron was ordered to launch airstrikes on the Kalaikunda Air Force Station. Thus on the morning of 7 September 1965, under the command of Squadron Leader Shabbir, the squadron's F-86 Sabres took off from Tejgaon with two 200-gallon and two 120-gallon drop tanks  while armed with nothing more than 50 cal gun ammunition. The squadron's strike team eventually reached the enemy base without being intercepted by enemy fighters and started strafing the Canberra bombers and Hawker Hunter fighters parked on the tarmac. The No. 14 Squadron's pilots managed to destroy 10 out of the 14 Canberra bombers along with two other types at the IAF base after which they safely returned to base at 07:44am.

Some hours later at 10:30am, the squadron received an order to execute another airstrike on the same base to ensure the complete destruction of Kalaikunda. Thus, a formation of four Sabres under the command of Flight Lieutenant Haleem was scrambled. Due to low visibility, the formation wasn't intercepted by enemy fighters on their way but upon reaching Kalaikunda, Indian Anti-Aircraft Guns which were on alert started firing at them. As the Sabres started their airstrikes, the formation was attacked by 9 Indian Hawker Hunters. The formation then split into two groups, one of which continued  the airstrikes while the other group, which consisted of Flying Officer Afzal Khan (Wingman) and Flight Lieutenant Tariq Habib (Leader), engaged the enemy Hunters. Tariq decided to jettison their fuel tanks, but Afzal was shot down before he could do so while one of Tariq's 4 fuel tanks got stuck. Despite that, he engaged 3 Indian Hunters in a 10-minute dogfight during which his Sabre got severely damaged. He eventually managed to shake off the enemy fighters and made it back to East Pakistan though his F-86 was scrapped since it was beyond repair. In the second strike on Kalaikunda, the squadron managed to destroy 4 to 8 Indian Canberra bombers.

Airstrikes on other IAF bases 
On 10 September, four Sabres from the No. 14 Squadron launched an airstrike on the IAF base of Baghdogra, four days later on 14 September, the squadron struck the IAF bases of Barrakpore and Agartala but since the IAF had retreated most of its aircraft from the eastern frontline, the squadron destroyed few aircraft in these strikes which included one Canberra, two fighters, five transport aircraft, and one helicopter.

Pakistani civil conflict and subsequent Indo-Pakistani war of 1971 

The No. 14 squadron carried out numerous CAS missions all around then East Pakistan during the civil uprising in 1971. After India intervened in the Conflict, the Squadron was the sole squadron of Pakistan defending East Pakistani airspace from the numerically superior Indian forces. It fought until the final days of the war until subsequently the Dhaka Airbase was destroyed by Indian Bombers and overrun by the invading Indian forces alongside Bengali rebels. By the end of the war, the squadron along with the Dhaka Airbase's ack-ack guns had destroyed 23 IAF warplanes.

Aerial Engagements with Soviet & Afghan Jets 

During the Soviet-Afghan war, Soviet and Afghan jets would bomb Afghan refugee camps and Mujahideen camps in the then North West Frontier Province (presently Khyber Pakhtunkhwa). Resultantly, the No. 14 Squadron, while operating the F-16 Fighting Falcon, was deployed at PAF Base Minhas at Kamra from where they carried out Combat Air Patrol missions on the Western Borders where they would eventually dogfight with Soviet and Afghan jets.

On 16 April 1987, Squadron Leader Badar Islam from the Tail Choppers shot down an Afghan Su-22 with an AIM-9L Sidewinder. On 4 August 1987, Squadron Leader Athar Bukhari shot down a Soviet Su-25 near Miranshah, the Soviet pilot, Colonel Alexander Rutskoy, safely ejected and was arrested by Pakistani authorities. He was later handed back to the Soviets on 16 August 1988.
Later, on 12 September 1988, Flight Lieutenant Khalid shot down two Mig-23. The squadron scored its last kill on 3 November 1988, when Flight Lieutenant Khalid Mehmood shot down an Afghan Su-22.

War on Terror 

During Operation Black Thunderstorm, an F-7P of the Tail Choppers performed a Sonic boom over the Peochar valley before Pakistani forces were inserted into the area. This was to create fear amongst the militants occupying the area.

Aircraft flown

See also

List of Pakistan Air Force squadrons
No. 9 Squadron (Pakistan Air Force)
No. 16 Squadron (Pakistan Air Force)
No. 26 Squadron (Pakistan Air Force)

Notes

References

Pakistan Air Force squadrons